The traditional Chinese lunisolar calendar divide a year into 24 solar terms. Gǔyǔ, Kokuu, Gogu, or Cốc vũ is the 6th solar term. It begins when the Sun reaches the celestial longitude of 30° and ends when it reaches the longitude of 45°. It more often refers in particular to the day when the Sun is exactly at the celestial longitude of 30°. In the Gregorian calendar, it usually begins around April 20 and ends around May 5.

Pentads 

Each solar term can be divided into 3 pentads (候). They are: first pentad (初候), second pentad (次候) and last pentad (末候). Pentads in Guyu include:

China
 First pentad: 萍始生, 'Duckweed begins to sprout'.
 Second pentad: 鳴鳩拂其羽, 'Cuckoo shakes off wings'.
 Last pentad: 戴勝降于桑, 'Hoopoe perches in mulberry trees'.

Japan
 First pentad: , 'Reed begins to bud'.
 Second pentad: , 'Frost ends and rice seedlings to grow'.
 Last pentad: , 'Peony blooms'.

Date and time

References

06
Spring (season)